Acanthocinus princeps, the ponderosa pine bark borer, is a species of longhorn beetle of the subfamily Lamiinae. It was described by Francis Walker in 1866.

References

Beetles described in 1866
Acanthocinus